Global 500 may refer to:

 Fortune Global 500, a list of the largest companies published by Fortune
 Global 500 Roll of Honour, an award given by the United Nations Environment Program
 Global 500 (internet), a list of the 500 most popular websites updated daily by Alexa Internet
 Financial Times Global 500, a list of the largest companies published by Financial Times